Jean Auguste Margueritte (15 January 1823 – 6 September 1870), French General, father of Victor Margueritte and Paul Margueritte.

After a career in Algeria, General Margueritte was mortally wounded in the great cavalry charge at Sedan, in which the Emperor was defeated and captured.  He died in Belgium. An account of his life was published by his son, Paul Margueritte as Mon père (1884; enlarged ed., 1897).

The sand cat is named in his honour, being given the binomial name Felis margarita.

References

1823 births
1870 deaths
French generals
French military personnel of the Franco-Prussian War
Jean Auguste